Mena Grabowski Trott (born Philomena Frances Grabowski on 16 September 1977, now Mena Grabowski Lazar) is a co-founder of Six Apart, creator of Movable Type and TypePad.

Career
Trott was president of Six Apart.  The company name originates from the fact that Trott and co-founder/ex-husband Benjamin Trott were born six days apart.

She remains on the Board of Directors after the merger which resulted in the formation of Say Media. She made her first efforts in weblogging at dollarshort.org in 2001.

Mena Trott was operating the blog "The Sew Weekly" at sewweekly.com. The blog encouraged people to "sew one garment a week".  Each week, Mena developed a theme, such as "tickled pink" (garments made from pink fabric) and "celebrating mothers" (garments which our mothers wore). That blog project appears to have come to an end as of December 2012.

Movable Type was originally developed by Mena Trott and Benjamin Trott during a period of unemployment in late 2001 for Mena's personal blogging use.

Recognition
Trott was named one of the People of the Year by PC Magazine in 2004. That same year, she was named a member of the TR100 by MIT Technology Review magazine, as one of the top 100 innovators in the world under the age of 35.

References

External links
 dollarshort.org Trott's weblog
 Mena Trott @ TED

1977 births
Living people
People from Sonoma County, California
American bloggers
American women bloggers
American women company founders
American company founders
21st-century American women
21st-century American businesspeople